Dato' Fuad bin Hassan (12 November 1949 - 8 December 2014) is a former Malaysian Malay politician from the United Malays National Organization Party (UMNO). He was once a member of the Selangor State Legislative Assembly for the Hulu Kelang state assembly representing UMNO.

Background
Fuad is the son of a religious figure who studied al-Quran, namely Haji Hassan Azhari (1928-2018). He is the eldest son, both of his younger siblings are former Inspector-General of Police of Police, Musa Hassan and actor, Jalaluddin Hassan.

He has a degree from National University Malaysia.

Political career
He was the Hulu Kelang assemblyman for two terms. In the 1999 general election, he lost to the candidate for People Justice Party at the time, Azmin Ali.

Since the defeat, he has retired from the political arena and now focuses on business. The latest is that he is trying to establish a low-cost airline company which is Asmara Air Services Sdn. Bhd. He became the Director General of the Department of Special Affairs or JASA of the Ministry of Information.

The experience, abilities and qualifications he has are considered very suitable for him to hold an important position in helping to strengthen the people's hopes and trust in the Malaysian government under the current leadership of UMNO.

Election results

Honours
 :
 Officer of the Order of the Defender of the Realm (K.M.N.) (2004)
 :
 Knight Companion of the Order of Sultan Salahuddin Abdul Aziz Shah (D.S.S.A.) - Dato' (1996)

Death
He died on 8 December 2014 at the age of 65.

References 

1949 births
2014 deaths
United Malays National Organisation politicians
Members of the Selangor State Legislative Assembly
Officers of the Order of the Defender of the Realm